Contres is a commune in the Cher department in the Centre-Val de Loire region of France.

Geography

Population

Sights
 The decommissioned church of St. Christophe, dating from the twelfth century.
 Biscuiterie Saint-Michel is based in Contres.

See also
Communes of the Cher department

References

Communes of Cher (department)